The Tibbetts Point Lighthouse is located in Cape Vincent (town), New York. The land upon which the lighthouse stands is a part of a  grant of land to Captain John Tibbetts of Troy, New York.

The current lighthouse was constructed in 1854.

The Tibbetts Point Lighthouse is on the Great Lakes Seaway Trail.

Its Fresnel lens is still used.  Only 70 such lenses are still operational in the United States, 16 being on the Great Lakes of which two are in New York.

Tibbetts Point Light is listed on the National Register of Historic Places.

Cultural
The Archives Center at the Smithsonian National Museum of American History has a collection (#1055) of souvenir postcards of lighthouses and has digitized 272 of these and made them available online.  These include postcards of Tibbetts Point Light  with links to customized nautical charts provided by National Oceanographic and Atmospheric Administration.

Notes

References
DeWire, Elinor, "Tibbets Point Lighthouse." Mariners Weather Log (Fall 1991), pp. 30–31.

Further reading
 Oleszewski, Wes. Great Lakes Lighthouses, American and Canadian: A Comprehensive Directory/Guide to Great Lakes Lighthouses, (Gwinn, Michigan: Avery Color Studios, Inc., 1998) .
 
 U.S. Coast Guard. Historically Famous Lighthouses (Washington, D.C.: Government Printing Office, 1957).
 Wright, Larry and Wright, Patricia. Great Lakes Lighthouses Encyclopedia Hardback (Erin: Boston Mills Press, 2006)

External links
 
 
 Tibbetts Point information from the National Park Services Maritime Heritage Program 
 Tibbetts Point information from the Lighthouse Getaway
 Lighthouses of the Great Lakes Seaway Trail
 Tibbetts Point Lighthouse 
 Lighthouse Friends site
 
 National Park Service Historic Lighthouses
 USCG list of Fresnel lenses still in operation December 2008

Lighthouses completed in 1854
Houses completed in 1854
1854 establishments in New York (state)
Lighthouses in Jefferson County, New York